DTJ may refer to:

D-topia Entertainment, previously known as DTJ, a Japanese record label
 ('Workers' Gymnastics Club'), a successor of the Sokol movement 
Detroj railway station, in Ahmedabad district, Gujarat, India
Destroy The Joint, an online Australian feminist group